Finn Kristensen (born 24 July 1936) is a Norwegian electrician, trade unionist and politician for the Labour Party. He served as Minister of Industry in 1981, from 1986–1988 and from 1992-1993 and Minister of Petroleum and Energy from 1990-1992. He was also an MP for Telemark from 1969 to 1985.

Early life
He was born in Brevik as a son of welder Bjarne Kornelius Kristensen (1912–1946) and cleaner Jenny Therese Eikefjord (1914–1989). He took a basic training as an electrician, beginning an apprenticeship in 1950. After four years of apprenticeship at Dalen Portland Cementfabrikk, he took one year at the Oslo School of Elementary Technics and learned strong current. He worked at sea for one year, and was then back at Dalen Portland from 1958 to 1962.

Political career
He started a political career in the municipal councils of Eidanger and Porsgrunn from 1959 to 1971. In 1962 he was hired as an instructor in Arbeidernes Opplysningsforbund, where he remained three years. During the same period he was a supervisory council member in the Norwegian Confederation of Trade Unions. In 1965 he was hired as a county secretary for Telemark Labour Party. He was also elected as a deputy representative to the Parliament of Norway from Telemark in 1965, and was subsequently elected to four full terms in 1969, 1973, 1977 and 1981.

In 1981 Kristensen served as Minister of Industry in the brief Brundtland's First Cabinet. His parliamentary seat was filled by Dagfinn Øksenholt and Einfrid Halvorsen. When Brundtland's Second Cabinet assumed office in 1986, Kristensen became Minister of Industry and served until the cabinet fell in 1989 (from 1988 the post was called Minister of Trade and Industry). When Brundtland's Second Cabinet assumed office in 1990, Kristensen became Minister of Petroleum and Energy. He also became head of the Ministry of Trade in September 1992, overseeing a merger with the Ministry of Petroleum and Energy to create the Ministry of Trade and Energy. Kristensen headed this ministry until October 1993.

In between his governmental jobs, Kristensen was the director of T-invest in Notodden from 1985 to 1986, then a director in Statoil from 1989 to 1990. From 1994 to 2007 he led his own company, F.K. Bedriftsutvikling. He was also a senior adviser in ABB until 1997.

Kristensen chaired Telemark Labour Party from 1972 to 1977, and was a national board member of the Labour Party from 1977 to 1981. He was a deputy board member of the Norwegian Labour Inspection Authority from 1974 to 1979 and Næringsøkonomisk institutt in 1980.

References

1936 births
Living people
Politicians from Porsgrunn
Members of the Storting
Politicians from Telemark
Labour Party (Norway) politicians
Government ministers of Norway
Petroleum and energy ministers of Norway
Equinor people
20th-century Norwegian politicians
Ministers of Trade and Shipping of Norway